The 1996 Porsche Tennis Grand Prix was a women's tennis tournament played on indoor hard courts at the Filderstadt Tennis Club in Filderstadt in Germany that was part of Tier II of the 1996 WTA Tour. It was the 19th edition of the tournament and was held from 7 October until 13 October 1996. Eighth-seeded Martina Hingis won the singles title.

Finals

Singles

 Martina Hingis defeated  Anke Huber 6–2, 3–6, 6–3
 It was Hingis' 1st singles title of the year and of her career.

Doubles

 Nicole Arendt /  Jana Novotná defeated  Martina Hingis /  Helena Suková 6–2, 6–3
 It was Arendt's 2nd title of the year and the 9th of her career. It was Novotná's 7th title of the year and the 73rd of her career.

References

External links
 ITF tournament edition details

Porsche Tennis Grand Prix
Porsche Tennis Grand Prix
1996 in German tennis
1990s in Baden-Württemberg
Porsch